Surrender to the Night is the second album by Trans Am, released in 1997.

Critical reception
Entertainment Weekly called the album "a blend of Wire-esque jaggedness, arena-rock machismo, and the occasional dance-friendly beat." The Washington Post deemed it "a great record from a band pushing all the dance/noise/punk envelopes."

AllMusic wrote: "The group is at its best when they stumble onto the occasional square foot of new territory (as on 'Cologne', 'Tough Love', and the title cut, all of which wed live, more immediately rock-based instrumentation with electro-funk rhythms and synth figures), but much of Surrender lays on familiar, by now somewhat fallow soil."

Track listing
 MOTR – 3:42
 Cologne – 4:05
 Illegalize It – 3:49
 Love Commander – 4:54
 Rough Justice – 3:31
 Zero Tolerance – 1:53
 Tough Love – 4:28
 Night Dreaming – 2:15
 Night Dancing – 2:40
 Carboforce – 7:45
 Surrender to the Night – 5:58

Japanese CD release additional live tracks
 Firepoker
 Strong Sensations
 Love Commander
 Surrender to the Night
 Rough Justice
 Night Dancing
 Ankoot Outro
 Orlando

References

1997 albums
Trans Am (band) albums
Thrill Jockey albums